Wright Creek is a  long tributary to the Nanticoke River that rises in western Sussex County, Delaware.  The creek straddles the Delaware state line for most of its course and is tidal for about half of its length.

See also
List of Delaware rivers
List of rivers of Maryland

References

Rivers of Delaware
Rivers of Maryland
Rivers of Sussex County, Delaware
Rivers of Caroline County, Maryland
Tributaries of the Nanticoke River